Manuel Hernández (born April 13, 1970 in Montevideo, Uruguay) is a former Uruguayan footballer who played for clubs of Uruguay and Chile.

Teams
  Huracán Buceo 1989-1995
  Colón 1996-1997
  Juventud Las Piedras 1998
  Basañez 1999
  Villa Española 2000
  Provincial Osorno 2000
  Central Español 2001
  El Tanque Sisley 2002
  Rentistas 2003

External links
 Profile at Tenfield Digital Profile at

1970 births
Living people
Uruguayan footballers
Uruguayan expatriate footballers
Central Español players
Huracán Buceo players
Villa Española players
C.A. Rentistas players
El Tanque Sisley players
Juventud de Las Piedras players
Provincial Osorno footballers
Chilean Primera División players
Expatriate footballers in Chile

Association footballers not categorized by position